Kind Lady is a 1935 American drama film directed by George B. Seitz starring Aline MacMahon, Basil Rathbone and Mary Carlisle. It is based on the play of the same name by Edward Chodorov and a short story called The Silver Mask by Hugh Walpole.

Doris Lloyd appeared in this film and its 1951 remake of the same name in different roles.

Plot
Wealthy and charitable Mary Herries (Aline MacMahon) is tricked by aspiring artist Henry Abbott (Basil Rathbone) into letting him and ill wife Ada (Justine Chase) stay in her stately home.

When he invites friends Mr. and Mrs. Edwards (Dudley Digges and Eily Malyon) to pay a visit, they overstay their welcome as well. Days turn into weeks, making Mary and housemaid Rose (Nola Luxford) increasingly anxious for everyone to leave.

It turns out to be a plot masterminded by the silky and sinister Abbott to steal everything Mary owns. He masquerades as a relative and they as her butler and maid, holding Mary and Rose captive in their rooms. Outsiders are told that Mary has gone on holiday to America and won't return for a long time.

The plot thickens as Rose is killed. The suspicions of Mary's nephew, Peter Santard, are confirmed when no record of Mary applying for a passport can be found. The police arrive just in time to save her and place Abbott under arrest.

Cast
 Aline MacMahon as Mary Herries
 Basil Rathbone as Henry Abbott
 Mary Carlisle as Phyllis
 Frank Albertson as Peter Santard
 Dudley Digges as Mr. Edwards
 Doris Lloyd as Lucy Weston
 Nola Luxford as Rose
 Murray Kinnell as Doctor
 Eily Malyon as Mrs. Edwards
 Justine Chase as Ada Abbott
 Barbara Shields as Aggie Edwards
 Donald Meek as Mr. Foster
 Frank Reicher as Gustave Roubet (as Frank Reigher)

References

External links
 
 
 
 

1935 films
1935 crime drama films
American crime drama films
American black-and-white films
Films about con artists
American films based on plays
Films directed by George B. Seitz
Metro-Goldwyn-Mayer films
Films set in London
Films scored by Edward Ward (composer)
1930s English-language films
1930s American films